"The Adjuster" is a short story written by American author F. Scott Fitzgerald. The story appears in Fitzgerald's third collection of short stories All the Sad Young Men, published by Scribners in February 1926. The story depicts the troubled relationship of married couple Luella and Charles Hemple, living in New York City in 1925.

Publication 
The Adjuster is the sixth story in the collection. All the Sad Young Men was published a year after his third and most celebrated novel, The Great Gatsby, and contains 9 stories:

Contents of All the Sad Young Men 

 "The Rich Boy"
 "Winter Dreams"
 "The Baby Party"
 "Absolution (short story)"
 "Rags Martin-Jones and the Pr-nce of W-les"
 "The Adjuster (short story)
 "Hot and Cold Blood"
 "The Sensible Thing""
 "Gretchen's Forty Winks"

Background 
F. Scott Fitzgerald was born on 24 September 1896 at 418 Laurel Avenue in St Paul, Minnesota. In 1911, when Fitzgerald was 15 years old, his parents sent him to the Newman School, a prestigious Catholic prep school in Hackensack, New Jersey. After graduating from the Newman School in 1913, Fitzgerald decided to stay in New Jersey to attend Princeton University. He joined up for the US Army in May 1917. Upon relocation to Camp Sheridan, near Montgomery, Alabama, he met Zelda Sayre, a daughter of a justice of the Alabama Supreme Court. Throughout 1924 their relations became more difficult, their volatility was expressed through increasingly erratic behaviour and by the end of the year Fitzgerald's drinking was developing into alcoholism. However, after a period of extensive revisions, The Great Gatsby was released on 10 April 1925. "The reception for the new work was impressive, and it quickly garnered some of Fitzgerald's most enthusiastic reviews but sales did not reach the best-seller levels the author and Scribner had hoped for."

As such, Fitzgerald wrote The Adjuster writing at the height of his career but also during a time of disillusionment. He was in financial difficulty, his wife Zelda was sick and he believed her romantically involved with another man., His play, The Vegetable, or From President to Postman had been a failure.

Composition 

Fitzgerald named this 1926 collection All the Sad Young Men, included only nine stories, and let them speak for themselves. Reading this harmonious collection one wonders how a writer could have made such progress in so few years. It is no surprise to discover that stories such as "The Rich Boy" and "Winter Dreams" were written alongside The Great Gatsby; they share the novel's sorrow for what was once the lifeblood of Fitzgerald's work – the felicities of youth. Like Gatsby, the collection shows the heights that Fitzgerald could reach, when money problems, alcoholism and tragedy were at bay.

One author states that All the Sad Young Men contained some of his most profound, if not most widely known, short stories, stating that “The Adjuster looks at the ramifications of a woman's decision to marry for money and what happens when her husband and child fall ill and she has to assume responsibility she never imagined” and that “All the Sad Young Men stands out as a bridge between Gatsby and Tender Is the Night” widely considered to be his best works, revealing a deepening of his talent in the interim between these two American classics.

A major profile of Fitzgerald ran on 17 April 1926, under a title that already felt inevitable, “That Sad Young Man.” John Chapin Mosher wrote of Fitzgerald's drinking and driving, his fabulous and yet-unmatched early success, and, happily, his dedication as a writer. “The popular picture of a blond boy scribbling off best sellers in odd moments between parties is nonsense. He's a very grave, hardworking man, and shows it. In fact there is the touch of the melancholy often obvious upon him.”

Reception 
Many of the stories praised in Fitzgerald's lifetime for their artistic brilliance have shown to be more carefully conceived and artfully crafted than they had been thought by Fitzgerald's contemporaries to be. Alice Petry highlights layers of complexity in "The Adjuster", which she describes as well known, but less often examined. Reviewers of All The Sad Young Men saw the same evidence of artistic maturity. "Fitzgerald has acquired maturity, a happy profundity," announced the Milwaukee Journal, and the Cleveland Plain Dealer likewise recognised "a ripened art, a wistful humour, a legitimate irony that comes from a development of understanding and wisdom."

Fitzgerald gained renewed popularity in the 1950s and 60s. Scott and Zelda became romantic figures, embodying the spirit of the Roaring Twenties along with other significant figures of the "Jazz Age" such as Ernest Hemingway. Both Hemingway and Fitzgerald Another theme commonly found in the works of these authors was the death of the American dream, which is exhibited throughout many of their novels. Although The Great Gatsby received a poor reception in the author's lifetime, it is now considered to be one of the greatest novels in American history.

Of All the Sad Young Men, The New York Times wrote, "The publication of this volume of short stories might easily have been an anti-climax after the perfection and success of 'The Great Gatsby' of last Spring. A novel so widely praised — by people whose recognition counts — is stiff competition. It is even something of a problem for a reviewer to find new and different words to properly grace the occasion. It must be said that the collection as a whole is not sustained to the high excellence of 'The Great Gatsby,' but it has stories of fine insight and finished craft."

Under the headline “Stories by Scott Fitzgerald, Some Good, Others Please Remit,” the reviewer of All The Sad Young Men on 13 March 1926 approved of “The Rich Boy,” “The Adjuster”, and “Winter Dreams.” On 20 March 1926, All The Sad Young Men was the sole recommendation under “Short Stories” in the “Tell Me a Book to Read” column, but with only partial praise: “Two, perhaps three samples of the Fitzgerald who wrote ‘Gatsby,’ one well-done experiment in the psycho-sexual, ‘slice’ genre, and some quid-pro-quoes for checks from magazines.”

Analysis 
In the introduction to I'd Die For You and Other Stories first published in 2017, Anne Margaret Daniel states that "Fitzgerald always considered himself a novelist, though he was a superb writer of short fiction. His short stories, loved and well known, stand alone, but they were often a testing ground for him, a place for rough drafts, an initial space for ideas and descriptions, characters and places, elements of which would find their way into his following novels." Fitzgerald was from the beginning of his career interested in psychological phenomena and their explanation.

According to Ronald Berman, "Fitzgerald's protagonists are judged by contemporary psychological standards… If we look at Fitzgerald's protagonists in the 1920s, it is fairly plain that they are intensely self-conscious. They try to explain themselves to themselves - and also, without much success, to others. They try to remake themselves." Luella Hample, as the protagonist of The Adjuster embodies Fitzgerald's exploration of psychoanalytical and behavioural tendencies.

"She paused, brooding. “I’m so sorry for him I don’t know what to do, Ede—but if we sat home, I’d just be sorry for myself. And to tell you another true thing, I’d rather that he’d be unhappy than me...Luella was not so much stating a case as thinking aloud. She considered that she was being very fair."

Stories from this collection including The Rich Boy, The Adjuster, and Absolution explore themes of the decadent lifestyle of the "Roaring 20s" but also the anxieties and difficulties of relationships and post-war depression. The Adjuster portrays themes of disenchantment, responsibility, fulfilment within relationships and marriage and is analogous of Fitzgerald's relationship to his wife Zelda Fitzgerald. The Australian states that “the stories here are about divorce and despair, working days and lonesome nights, smart teenagers unable to attend college or find a job, the wild vitality and grinding poverty of New York City.”

See also 

 F. Scott Fitzgerald
 All the Sad Young Men
 The Rich Boy
 Winter Dreams
 The Great Gatsby

References 

Short stories by F. Scott Fitzgerald
1926 short stories